Tessie Tomas (born October 31, 1950) is a Filipina actress, writer, host, standup comedian, and a former advertising executive. She is best known for being part of the RPN sketch comedy show Champoy and the host of the ABS-CBN talk show Teysi ng Tahanan. In 1980, Tomas became the first female creative director of the McCann Erickson Philippines.

In an interview with GMA Network's Tunay Na Buhay, Tomas recalled working for an ad agency prior to her career as a presenter and actress. Tessie later appeared in both comedic and dramatic roles, notably in the 2012 remake of the film Mundo Man ay Magunaw and 2015's Buena Familia.

In 2018, Tomas played a supporting role in the ABS-CBN soap opera The Blood Sisters.

In 2023, she did an acting comeback as Doña Cioelo Fiero, an antagonist in the ABS-CBN crime drama Dirty Linen.

Filmography

Television

Movies
Kapitan Kidlat (1981)
Schoolgirls (1982)
My Only Love (1982)
Erpat Kong Forgets (1984)
Mendoza At Pandesal (1985)
Napakasakit, Kuya Eddie (1986)
Forward March (1987)
A Dangerous Life (1988)
Barbi For President (1991)
Pempe Ni Sara At Pen (1992)
Dino: Abangan Ang Susunod Na (1993)
Walang Matigas na Pulis, Sa Matinik na Misis (1994)
Yes Darling: Walang Matigas na Pulis 2 (1997) 
Dahil Ba Sa Kanya (1998)
Bukas Na Lang Kita Mamahalin (2000)
Narinig Mo Ba Ang L8tests (2001)
Otso-Otso Pamela-Mela-Wan (2004)
Pinoy Blonde (2005)
Rome & Juliet (2006)
One True Love (2008)
Sanglaan (2009)
Two Funerals (2010)
This Guy Is In Love With U Mare (2012)
Coming Soon (2013)
Alienasyon (2014)
Water Lemon (2015)
Smaller and Smaller Circles (2017)

References

External links
 

1950 births
Living people
20th-century Filipino actresses
Filipino television talk show hosts
Filipino women comedians
ABS-CBN personalities
GMA Network personalities